Rudall, South Australia is a town and locality in Australia.

Rudall may also refer to:

People
Nicholas Rudall (1940–2018), Professor of Classical Languages and Literatures, University of Chicago
Paula Rudall (born 1954), British botanist
Reginald Rudall (1885–1955), Australian lawyer and politician
Samuel Bruce Rudall (1859–1945), South Australian politician
Rudall Hayward (1900–1974), New Zealand filmmaker

Places
Rudall Conservation Park, a protected area in Australia
Rudall River, river in  Western Australia